The 1966–67 season was FC Dinamo București's 18th season in Divizia A. Because of the disappointing previous season, manager Angelo Niculescu is replaced by Traian Ionescu who begines to reconstruct the team, relying more on young players such as Dumitrache, Lucescu or Dinu. Dinamo fights for the title but loses the battle with Rapid in the last day of the championship.

Results

Squad 

Goalkeepers: Ilie Datcu, Spiridon Niculescu.

Defenders: Dumitru Ivan, Ion Nunweiller, Lică Nunweiller, Lazăr Pârvu, Cornel Popa, Mircea Stoenescu.

Midfielders: Cornel Dinu, Vasile Gergely, Gheorghe Grozea, Octavian Popescu, Constantin Ștefan.

Forwards: Florea Dumitrache, Daniel Ene, Gheorghe Ene, Constantin Frățilă, Ion Haidu, Radu Nunweiller, Petre Nuțu, Ion Pîrcălab, Iosif Varga.

Transfers 

Emil Petru is transferred to Universitatea Cluj. Mircea Lucescu is loaned to Politehnica București. Cornel Dinu is brought from Targoviste.

References 
 www.labtof.ro
 www.romaniansoccer.ro

1966
Association football clubs 1966–67 season
Dinamo